Alberto Mendes Coelho (born 7 August 1961) is an Angolan boxer. He competed in the men's lightweight event at the 1980 Summer Olympics.

References

External links
 

1961 births
Living people
Angolan male boxers
Olympic boxers of Angola
Boxers at the 1980 Summer Olympics
Place of birth missing (living people)
Lightweight boxers